In early February 2010, Elton John and Billy Joel set out on another leg of their concert series Face to Face. Most of these shows had been rescheduled from the year before when John had contracted E.Coli, forcing the pair to cancel the concerts planned for the fall of 2009. Joel had also fallen unwell at the time of the gigs the previous year.

Despite several outlets reporting four summer concerts in Chicago, Pittsburgh and Boston, Joel denied rumours in the trade press announcing that he cancelled a summer 2010 leg of the tour, claiming that those concerts were never booked in the first place and that he intended to take the year off from performing and music. Joel told Rolling Stone magazine: "We'll probably pick it up again. It's always fun playing with him."

Joel stated in 2012 that he would no longer tour with Elton because it restrained his setlists.

Tour dates

Cancellations and rescheduled shows

Setlist

References

External links

 Information Site with Tour Dates

2010 concert tours
Billy Joel concert tours
Co-headlining concert tours
Elton John concert tours
February 2010 events in the United States
March 2010 events in the United States